The Tiwa Autonomous Council (Tiwashong)  is one of the Autonomous regions of India for the welfare and protection of the Tiwa people  in the Indian State of Assam. It was formed in 1995.

See also
 Tiwa (Lalung)
 Tiwa language (India)
 Matak Autonomous Council
 Kamatapur Autonomous Council

References

Autonomous district councils of India
Local government in Assam
Tiwa (India)